This is a list of live action bisexual characters in television (includes TV movies and web series). The orientation can be portrayed on-screen, described in the dialogue or mentioned. Roles include lead, main, recurring, supporting, and guest.

The names are organized in alphabetical order by the surname (i.e. last name), or by a single name if the character does not have a surname. Some naming customs write the family name first followed by the given name; in these cases, the names in the list appear under the family name (e.g. the name Jung Seo-hyun [Korean] is organized alphabetically under "J").



Bisexual characters

Female

Male

See also

 Bisexual community
 Bisexual Book Awards
 Lists of bisexual people
 Bi Any Other Name: Bisexual People Speak Out
 List of dramatic television series with LGBT characters: 1960s–2000s
 List of dramatic television series with LGBT characters: 2010s
 List of dramatic television series with LGBT characters: 2020s
 List of comedy television series with LGBT characters
 List of made-for-television films with LGBT characters
 List of soap operas with LGBT characters
 List of reality television programs with LGBT cast members
 List of LGBT characters

Notes

References

Parenthetical

Further reading
 
 
 
 
 

Bisexuality-related lists
Bisexuality-related mass media
Lists of character lists
Lists of entertainment lists
Bisexual in television
Bisexual characters
LGBT
LGBT